is a public aerodrome located about  south of Okayama Station in Minami-ku, Okayama, Japan.

History
The airport opened on October 13, 1962, as Okayama Airport. It had scheduled service by All Nippon Airways (Tokyo Haneda) and Toa Domestic Airlines (Matsuyama and Miyazaki); however, the runway was too short to accommodate jet service, and the largest aircraft that could reliably use the airport was the NAMC YS-11.

On March 11, 1988, concurrently with the opening of new Okayama Airport, Konan became an airport exclusively for small planes under the present name.

A ten-seat Cessna jet overshot the runway at the airport on June 10, 2015, landing in a nearby lake.

Ground transportation

Bus

References

Airports in Japan
Transport in Okayama Prefecture
Buildings and structures in Okayama Prefecture
Airports established in 1962
1962 establishments in Japan
Okayama